The Law and His Son is a 1913 American drama film featuring Harry Carey.

Cast
 Harry Carey as Manning
 Claire McDowell as Marguerite, Manning's Sister
 Reggie Morris as The Outcast Son
 William J. Butler as The Outcast Son's Father
 Frank Evans as Prison Official
 Hector Sarno as In Club

See also
 Harry Carey filmography

External links

1913 films
1913 short films
American silent short films
American black-and-white films
1913 drama films
Films directed by Anthony O'Sullivan
Silent American drama films
1910s American films